Abdera flexuosa is a species of false darkling beetle (Melandryidae).
(Paykull, 1799)

It associates with plants:
 Alnus glutinosa — Black Alder
 Salix — Willow

See also
 List of beetle species recorded in Britain – superfamily Tenebrionoidea

References

Melandryidae
Beetles described in 1799
Taxa named by Gustaf von Paykull